27 suosikkia is the first compilation album by Finnish singer and songwriter Olavi Uusivirta.

Track listing

Charts

Release history

References

2013 albums
Olavi Uusivirta albums
Finnish-language albums